Emilio Enrique Pagán (born May 7, 1991) is an American professional baseball pitcher for the Minnesota Twins of Major League Baseball (MLB). He previously played for the Tampa Bay Rays, Seattle Mariners, Oakland Athletics and San Diego Padres.

Amateur career
Pagán attended J. L. Mann High School in Greenville, South Carolina, and played college baseball at Belmont Abbey College. He was drafted by the Seattle Mariners in the 10th round of the 2013 Major League Baseball draft.

Professional career

Seattle Mariners
After signing with the Mariners, Pagán made his professional debut that year with the Pulaski Mariners. He was promoted to the Everett AquaSox in August. In 26.1 relief innings pitched between the two teams he was 1–1 with a 1.03 ERA and 35 strikeouts. In 2014, he pitched for the Clinton LumberKings where he compiled a 2–3 record and 2.89 ERA in 42 relief appearances, and in 2015, he played with the Bakersfield Blaze where he pitched to a 3–8 record and 2.53 ERA. Pagán spent 2016 with the Jackson Generals and Tacoma Rainers, compiling a combined 5–3 record and 2.49 ERA in 65 innings pitched out of the bullpen. 

Pagán was on Puerto Rico's roster for the 2017 World Baseball Classic. He began the season with Tacoma and was promoted to the major leagues on May 2. On May 3, 2017, he made his major league debut for the Mariners against the Los Angeles Angels of Anaheim at Safeco Field. He was sent down and recalled multiple times during the season before he was recalled for the remainder of the season on July 7. In 34 relief appearances for Seattle, he was 2–3 with a 3.22 ERA, and in 23 appearances for Tacoma, he was 2–1 with a 2.56 ERA.

Oakland Athletics
On November 15, 2017, Pagán was traded to the Oakland Athletics, along with Alexander Campos, for Ryon Healy. He began the season with Oakland, but was sent down to the Nashville Sounds on May 2. He was recalled back to Oakland on May 18.

Tampa Bay Rays
On December 21, 2018, the Athletics traded Pagán to the Tampa Bay Rays in a three team deal in which the Rays also acquired Rollie Lacy and a competitive balance pick in the 2019 MLB draft, the Athletics acquired Jurickson Profar, and the Texas Rangers acquired Brock Burke, Kyle Bird, Yoel Espinal, Eli White, and $750,000 of international signing bonus pool space.

In 2019, after an impressive spring training, Pagán was sent to the Triple-A Durham Bulls. He was recalled on April 16, after Blake Snell fractured his toe. On April 19, Pagán was optioned to Durham when Casey Sadler was recalled, then Pagán was recalled two days later. Pagán later on became the team's closer and finished the season recording 20 saves. He finished with a 2.31 ERA and 96 strikeouts in 70 innings.

San Diego Padres
On February 8, 2020, the Rays traded Pagán to the San Diego Padres in exchange for Manuel Margot and Logan Driscoll. Through August 20, 2020, Pagán had blown 4 saves and pitched to a 7.36 ERA, but after that point he recorded 10 out of 11 scoreless innings, only surrendering 2 runs with a 1.64 ERA to finish the season.

Minnesota Twins
On April 7, 2022, the Padres traded Pagán, Chris Paddack, and a player to be named later, later announced as pitcher Brayan Medina, to the Minnesota Twins in exchange for Taylor Rogers, Brent Rooker, and cash considerations.
For the 2022 season, Pagan went 4-6, while recording a 4.43 ERA with 84 strikeouts across 63 innings pitched. He also recorded 9 saves.

On January 13, 2023, Pagán agreed to a one-year, $3.5 million contract with the Twins, avoiding salary arbitration.

References

External links

1991 births
Living people
People from Simpsonville, South Carolina
Baseball players from South Carolina
American sportspeople of Puerto Rican descent
Major League Baseball pitchers
Seattle Mariners players
Oakland Athletics players
Tampa Bay Rays players
San Diego Padres players
Minnesota Twins players
Gardner–Webb Runnin' Bulldogs baseball players
Belmont Abbey Crusaders baseball players
Pulaski Mariners players
Everett AquaSox players
Clinton LumberKings players
Gigantes de Carolina players
Bakersfield Blaze players
Jackson Generals (Southern League) players
Tacoma Rainiers players
Nashville Sounds players
Durham Bulls players
2017 World Baseball Classic players
2023 World Baseball Classic players